Özay Fecht (born 1953) is a Turkish-German actress and jazz singer. She was born in Istanbul and went to Germany when she was eighteen and found success.

Filmography

Television

Music 
In the 1990s, she played in a group with Steve Lacy and John Betsch.

Discography
 1985: No More
 1988: Moves with Doug Hammond
 1995: Antiquated Love

References

External links
 

1953 births
Living people
German people of Turkish descent
German television actresses
German film actresses
Turkish film actresses
Turkish television actresses
Best Actress German Film Award winners
Musicians from Istanbul
Turkish jazz singers
Turkish women singers